Hurchillo is a village in Alicante, Spain. It is part of the municipality of Orihuela

Towns in Spain
Populated places in the Province of Alicante
Vega Baja del Segura